Soore University (SU) (Dânešgâh-e Sure) is a semi-private non-for-profit research university located in Tehran, Iran. Soore University was founded in 1994, and it is considered among the top art universities in Iran alongside Tehran University of Art and College of Fine Arts at University of Tehran. Historically, Soore University is particularly strong in Graphic Design and Cinema among arts.

History 
The Art Depratment of the Islamic Advertisement Organization began to work independently in the early years of the 1970s in the area of teaching various art courses. Thousands of trainees from different parts of the country got instructed in such art programs by these curriculums and later made use of their educations formally or informally. At the beginning of the Ali Khamenei's leadership period, he emphasized the necessity for the artistic fields' attention to the underlying, monumental, and fundamental problems and also, that aware and committed artists should widely and actively attend and play their roles in a way that is suitable to the comprehensive dimensions of the cultural invasion. Following his words, after doing extensive surveys, the Art Department of the organization alongside the Artistic Sect of the Islamic Republic of Iran got determined to set up an academic unit to solve the major problems of the artists and those interested in art. They decided to do so in response to the shortcomings of the educational institutions by making use of their artistic and cultural experiences. It was an effort to compensate for the lack of the workforce acquainted with the problems of the art and culture, and to fulfil the objective of promoting the ritual art and tending the literature of the Islamic revolution by cultivating the committed and religious alumni. To answer the mentioned policy, Soore Educational Institution, which had been initially created to independently hold the training courses, was formally registered and continued its activity under the title of Soore Higher Education Institution.

In 2003, the vice-chancellor of the Art Department of Islamic Advertisement Organization proceeded to establish Soore non-profit higher education institution of the second type. After meeting with the approval of the High Council and consolidating its acts to acknowledge second stage institutions, the Soore non-profit Higher Education Institution of the second stage was promoted to the first stage institute in the spring of 1997. Soore higher education institution had two other branches. One in Isfahan which was established in August 1996 with two courses in cinema and theatre and the branch of Ardabil which was founded on 17 November 1996 with two programs in architecture at the associate degree and restoration at the bachelors level.

Furthermore, in 2010, after coming to a principle agreement, the Soore Higher Education Institution was converted into a university. In 2012, with the kind permission of the Ministry of Science, Research and Technology, Soore University managed to hold courses in Cinema and Islamic Architecture at the masters' level. After obtaining the related license in 2013, the higher education programming and development council of the Science Ministry declared for changing the name of Soore Higher Education Institution to Soore University. In 2020, Soore University accepted its founding PhD cohort, in the field of Communication studies and later in 2022, its first cohort, in the field of Comparative Islamic Art History.

Also, for running the programs in Cultural Relations and Advertisement, Media Laws and Media Management at the masters' level, the required arrangements were made, and Soore succeeded to obtain the necessary permissions for holding the courses in Cultural Relations and Advertisement at the masters' level along with Journalism and Public Relations at the bachelors' level in 2006-2007. Since February 2007, university students were taking these three courses. In 2009, Soore managed to run the first course in the Management of Cultural Affairs at the bachelors' level. In the same year, with the permission of the Science Ministry, Soore began to accept university students in some courses without holding the entrance exams. In June 2013, the Higher Education Programming and Development office of the Science Ministry declared for running the Management of Public Relations course at the bachelor's level and the courses on Media Management and the Management of the Cultural Programming at the masters' level.

Schools and programs

School of Art 
The art faculty of Soore University commenced its work as the most significant, the biggest and oldest faculty of Soore University on 28 8th 2006 with the approval of the trustees' board and the board of directors with the aim of dividing the educational and scientific activities in the specialized fields and areas and with the intention of attaining the formal and verified structures of the Science, Research and technology ministry.

School of Architecture & Urban Planning 
The faculty of architecture was founded in 1993 and the aim of establishing this faculty is to ameliorate the cultural components in architecture and introduce and updating the Iranian architecture considering the current needs of the Iranian society and effective steps have been taken towards accomplishing these goals by employing the inside experienced professors and making the relationship with the universities of the other countries.

School of Culture & Communication 
Although the foundation of Soore University was laid based on running art courses and educating creative artists, as the times was passing, the new requirements were revealed to the authorities of the university forcing them to review the goals and policies of the university. Accordingly, the proposal for establishing new courses was posed until an agreement was finally reached to run the journalism and public relations courses for the BA degree and culture communications and propaganda courses in master's degree.

Notable alumni

Notable faculty

See also 
Islamic Development Organization
The Artistic Sect of the Islamic Republic

References

External links 
 
  

Universities in Iran
Universities in Tehran